BFK may refer to

 Battelle for Kids, a not-for-profit organization
 BFK (song), by rapper Freddie Gibbs
 BFK (Swiss Air Force), short for Berufsfliegerkorps
 BFK (British Rail coach designation)
 BFK (FAA airport code)
 BFK (IATA airport code)

See also 
 Borgward Kolibri, a helicopter design with the official designation "Borgward BFK-1 Kolibri"